United States v. Colgate & Co., 250 U.S. 300 (1919), is a United States antitrust law case in which the United States Supreme Court noted that a company has the power to decide with whom to do business. Per the Colgate Doctrine, a company may unilaterally terminate business with any other company without triggering a violation of the antitrust laws.

This case created an exception to vertical price restraints in vertical agreements. According to the ruling, resale price maintenance is generally illegal per se, but if a supplier merely says it will not deal with resellers that charge less than the supplier's stipulated price, the supplier need not deal with such a retailer. This is a narrow exception, as companies are still prohibited from threatening or warning price-cutters.

Facts
Colgate & Co. had a policy of refusing to deal with vendors who sold below suggested retail price. Colgate simply refused to continue to deal with a vendor that Colgate determined was not abiding by the rules. In cutting off these contracts, Colgate was willing to allow a vendor to sell out current inventory.

Judgment
The Sherman Act §§ 1-7, 15 note, is intended to prohibit monopolies and combinations, which probably would interfere with the free exercise of their rights by those engaged, or who wish to engage in trade; but in the absence of any purpose to create or maintain a monopoly a manufacturer engaged in private business may exercise his discretion as to parties with whom he will deal, and may refuse to sell to those who will not maintain specified resale prices.

See also
List of United States Supreme Court cases, volume 250
List of United States Supreme Court cases
Unilateral Policy

References

External links
 
6 U.C. Davis Bus. L.J. 22 (2006)
Hogan Lovells May 2009 Antitrust Update
St Olaf Antirust Summary
33 American Lar Review Vol. 462 (1984)

United States Supreme Court decisions that overrule a prior Supreme Court decision
United States Supreme Court cases
United States antitrust case law
1919 in United States case law
United States Supreme Court cases of the White Court
Colgate-Palmolive